Bhave High School (also known as MES Bhave High School) is a school and Junior college based in Pune, India. The institution is run by the Maharashtra Education Society, a private education institution founded by Vasudeo Balwant Phadke, Vaman Prabhakar Bhave and Laxman Narhar Indapurkar in 1860.

Notable alumni
Aditya Chaphalkar - space research scientist at the Vikram Sarabhai Space Centre in Thiruvananthapuram. He is also a Gold medallist at Indian Institute of Space Science and Technology (IISST),  first recipient of the Indian Department of Space's Satish Dhawan Fellowship in 2013, fellowship and prize-winner for the master's degree in aerospace engineering at the California Institute of Technology.
Pandurang Vasudeo Sukhatme (1911–1997) - Eminent Statistician, recipient of Padmabhushan award
Mangesh Tendulkar - noted cartoonist
Narendra Karmarkar - mathematician and creator of Karmarkar's algorithm
Shriram Lagoo - prominent stage and film actor

See also 
 Notable institutions run by Maharashtra Education Society (MES)

References

External links 
 

Universities and colleges in Pune
Maharashtra Education Society